Cordel Leonard "Corey" Koskie (born June 28, 1973) is a Canadian former professional baseball third baseman, who played in Major League Baseball for the Minnesota Twins, Toronto Blue Jays, and Milwaukee Brewers. On February 4, 2015, Koskie was elected to the Canadian Baseball Hall of Fame.

Early life
Koskie was born in Anola, Manitoba. He was the first Manitoba-born-and-raised player to ever reach the Major Leagues, and the first Manitoba-born player in MLB since Bud Sketchley in 1942. Koskie grew up on a farm in Anola and practiced baseball by hitting rocks with a wiffle ball bat. He took lessons in Ukrainian dance as a child.

Koskie's primary sports in his youth were ice hockey and volleyball. He played junior hockey for the Selkirk Steelers and was recruited to play college hockey at Minnesota-Duluth but chose instead to play volleyball for Garth Pischke at the University of Manitoba.

Koskie left the Manitoba Bisons as a sophomore to play college baseball at Des Moines Area Community College in Boone, Iowa. He subsequently began playing at the National Baseball Institute in British Columbia.

Baseball career
Koskie was drafted by the Minnesota Twins in the 26th round of the 1994 Major League Baseball draft, and subsequently made his MLB debut on September 9, 1998. He established himself in 1999 as the Twins' third baseman of the future by hitting .310 and knocking in 58 runs. In 2000, he batted .300 with a .400 on-base percentage and in 2001 he had his most productive offensive season when he hit 26 home runs, had 103 RBI, and scored 100 runs.

Koskie signed a three-year, $17-million contract with the Toronto Blue Jays on December 14, 2004. An injury-plagued  season cut his productivity and playing time, as he struggled with a .249 average, with 11 home runs, 36 RBI, and 4 stolen bases in 97 games. Despite his frequent injuries, Koskie was regarded as one of the more athletic third basemen in the game.

On January 6, 2006, he was traded by the Blue Jays to the Milwaukee Brewers for pitcher Brian Wolfe. The deal was widely viewed as a salary dump for the Blue Jays after the team traded for Troy Glaus. With several players on the roster capable of playing third base (Koskie, Glaus, Eric Hinske, Shea Hillenbrand, and Aaron Hill) and no assurances of regular playing time from Blue Jays general manager J.P. Ricciardi, Koskie was traded just a year after being the Blue Jays' 2004 offseason marquee free agent signing.

While the Brewers acquired a veteran infielder with a solid glove and bat to anchor their very young infield, Koskie's later seasons were marred by injuries, including missing most of the 2006 season with post-concussion syndrome from an injury he received on July 5, 2006.

"If I can't play, I at least want my life back", he said. "I'm hoping to do something to help the team this year. I want to play baseball again. If I can play baseball, I know I'm fine." The injury caused him to miss the entire 2007 season.

In , Koskie worked out at the Minnesota Twins spring training camp and played for Team Canada in the World Baseball Classic. Koskie signed a minor league deal with an invitation to spring training with the Chicago Cubs on February 28. On March 21, 2009, Koskie retired. While confident in his abilities, he did not want to risk his health. His fear of injury led to a diagnosis of post traumatic stress disorder.

Post-retirement
Koskie was a Planet Fitness franchisee in the Minneapolis–Saint Paul area from 2010 to 2016. He recounted his experiences in a January 29, 2016 article for The Players' Tribune. As of 2016, Koskie lived in Plymouth, Minnesota with his wife and their four sons.

Koskie was inducted into the Manitoba Sports Hall of Fame in 2013.

References

External links

1973 births
Living people
Baseball people from Manitoba
Canadian Baseball Hall of Fame inductees
Canadian expatriate baseball players in the United States
Elizabethton Twins players
Fort Myers Miracle players
Fort Wayne Wizards players
Major League Baseball players from Canada
Major League Baseball third basemen
Milwaukee Brewers players
Minnesota Twins players
New Britain Rock Cats players
People from Eastman Region, Manitoba
Salt Lake Buzz players
Selkirk Steelers players
Syracuse SkyChiefs players
Toronto Blue Jays players
World Baseball Classic players of Canada
2006 World Baseball Classic players
2009 World Baseball Classic players